Shawn Murphy (born May 16, 1948) is an American sound engineer. He has won an Academy Award for Best Sound and has been nominated for another three in the same category. He has worked on more than 400 films since 1983.

Selected filmography
Murphy has won an Academy Award for Best Sound and has been nominated for another three:

Won
 Jurassic Park (1993)

Nominated
 Indiana Jones and the Last Crusade (1989)
 Star Wars: Episode I – The Phantom Menace (1999)
 West Side Story (2021)

References

External links

1948 births
Living people
American audio engineers
Best Sound Mixing Academy Award winners
People from Los Angeles
Emmy Award winners
San Francisco State University alumni
Engineers from California